The Grehn Case (German: Der Fall Grehn) is a 1916 German silent crime film directed by William Kahn and starring Reinhold Schünzel and Ernst Pittschau. A detective investigates the murder of a painter.

Cast
 Reinhold Schünzel as Kriminalrat Rat Anheim 
 Ernst Pittschau as Professor Herkdal 
 Conrad Barden as Mahler Jan Grehn 
 Gernot Bock-Stieber as Globetrotter Diaz Ramson 
 Otto Collet
 August Rotter as van Gylhem 
 Lo Vallis as Cläre Pontda

References

Bibliography
 Bock, Hans-Michael & Bergfelder, Tim. The Concise CineGraph. Encyclopedia of German Cinema. Berghahn Books, 2009.

External links

1916 films
Films of the German Empire
German silent feature films
Films directed by William Kahn
German crime films
1916 crime films
German black-and-white films
1910s German films